Mary A. Legere is a retired lieutenant general and the former Deputy Chief of Staff for Intelligence (G-2) of the United States Army.

Military career

Legere attended the University of New Hampshire, receiving a bachelor's degree in political science in 1982. She was commissioned through the university's Army Reserve Officers' Training Corps program, and subsequently joined the Army's Military Intelligence Corps. She says that she originally intended to serve four years, and then find work in the United States Intelligence Community or the Foreign Service. Her subsequent military education includes the United States Army Command and General Staff College and the United States Army War College, where she received master's degrees in Military Science and Strategy, respectively.

Legere rose up through the ranks, serving in a number of intelligence command positions. From 2002 to 2004, she was the Commander of the 501st Military Intelligence Brigade. From 2008 to 2009, then-Brigadier General Legere served as the Deputy Chief of Staff for Intelligence of the Multi-National Force – Iraq. From 2009 to 2012, then-Major General Legere served as the Commander of the United States Army Intelligence and Security Command (the army's contribution to the United States Intelligence Community).

On April 12, 2012, Legere was promoted to lieutenant general and became the Deputy Chief of Staff for Intelligence (G-2) of the United States Army. However, her time as G-2 was marked by controversy when she ordered the rescindment and rewriting of a report that criticized the army's DCGS intelligence analysis system and instead pushed for the procurement of a privately-produced alternative system.

In May 2014 Legere was reportedly the top contender to head the Defense Intelligence Agency, the main spy organization for the United States military. If nominated and confirmed, she would have been the first woman to head the agency. She did not, however, receive the position. Legere retired in 2017 and joined Accenture Federal Services as the managing director for national and defense intelligence. She also serves as an Advisor of the nonprofit Military Cyber Professionals Association (MCPA).

References

External links

Official Army biography

Living people
Female generals of the United States Army
United States Army War College alumni
United States Army Command and General Staff College alumni
University of New Hampshire alumni
Recipients of the Legion of Merit
Year of birth missing (living people)